Nelson Coquenão da Luz (born 4 February 1998) is an Angolan footballer who plays as a midfielder for Portuguese club Vitória de Guimarães B.

Club career
In September 2020, he signed in for Portugal's Primeira Liga side Vitória de Guimarães.

International career
At the youth international level he played in 2015 African U-17 Championship qualification and the 2016 COSAFA U-20 Cup.

Career statistics

Club

Notes

International

References

1998 births
Living people
Angolan footballers
Angola international footballers
Angola under-20 international footballers
Angola youth international footballers
Association football midfielders
C.D. Primeiro de Agosto players
Vitória S.C. players
Vitória S.C. B players
Girabola players
Liga Portugal 2 players
Footballers from Luanda
Angolan expatriate footballers
Expatriate footballers in Portugal
Angolan expatriate sportspeople in Portugal